Skra, before 1926 Loumitsa is a village and community in the municipality of Paionia, Kilkis regional unit of Greece.

In 2011 the population was 187 for the village, and 234 for the community, including the village Koupa. It is situated 10 km south of the border with the Republic of North Macedonia and its altitude is 548 m.

The village is best known for the Battle of Skra-di-Legen of May 1918. The village has a monument and museum dedicated to the battle.

Before the First World War, the village was much larger and inhabited mainly by Megleno-Romanians.

According to the book "Macedonia — ethnography and statistics" by Vasil Kanchov, there were 2,600 Megleno-Romanian inhabitants in the village in 1900.

Notable people
 Dumitru Ciotti (1882/1885–1974), Megleno-Romanian activist, editor and schoolteacher

References

Greece.com
"Македония. Етнография и статистика"' (Macedonia — ethnography and statistics 1900).

Megleno-Romanian settlements
Populated places in Kilkis (regional unit)